Mária Pap (born 16 October 1955) is a Hungarian athlete. She competed in the women's long jump at the 1980 Summer Olympics. Born in Budapest, she is the sister-in-law of Olympic javelin champion Miklós Németh.

References

1955 births
Living people
Athletes (track and field) at the 1980 Summer Olympics
Hungarian female long jumpers
Olympic athletes of Hungary
Athletes from Budapest